Enes Freedom (born Enes Kanter; May 20, 1992) is a Turkish-American professional basketball player who last played for the Boston Celtics of the National Basketball Association (NBA). Born in Switzerland to Turkish parents, he was raised in Turkey and moved to the United States as a teenager. Freedom was selected as the third overall pick of the 2011 NBA draft by the Utah Jazz. A center, Freedom has played for five NBA teams since entering the league in 2011. Between 2008 and 2015, he represented the Turkish national team in international play.

Early years
Enes Kanter Freedom was born on May 20, 1992 in Zürich, Switzerland as Enes Kanter. Kanter's parents are Turkish. His father, Mehmet Kanter, received his M.D. from the University of Zurich. The family then returned to Turkey, where Kanter grew up. Mehmet Kanter became a professor of histology and genetics at Trakya University. Kanter's mother, Gülsüm Kanter, is a nurse. Kanter has three younger siblings: two brothers (including basketball player Kerem Kanter) and one sister.

Starting in second grade, Kanter attended Hizmet-affiliated schools, part of the Gülen movement in Turkey. He lived in Ankara and then moved to Istanbul to play professional basketball as a teen.

At the age of 17, Kanter moved to the United States to play basketball. He attended Findlay Prep in Henderson, Nevada, and then Mountain State Academy in Beckley, West Virginia; neither school allowed him to play high school basketball because of his contract with Nike while he played basketball professionally. Kanter then attended Stoneridge Preparatory School in Simi Valley, California, where he was able to play basketball for a season.

Professional career

Fenerbahçe (2008–2009) 
Before moving to the United States, Kanter played under Serdar Apaydın's management for the Fenerbahçe youth squad between 2006 and 2008 and then, during the 2008–09 season, Kanter was a seldom-used reserve for the Fenerbahçe senior team. He played in at least nine games with the team: four in the EuroLeague and five in the Turkish Super League. Fenerbahçe and the Greek League basketball team Olympiacos both offered Kanter professional contracts, but he declined because he wanted to play high school and college basketball in the United States.

In 2009, Kanter moved to the United States, where he enrolled at Stoneridge Preparatory School in Simi Valley, California, and played for the basketball team in 2009–10. At the 2010 Nike Hoop Summit, Kanter played for the international team, recording 34 points and 13 rebounds. His point total was a record for the event, breaking Dirk Nowitzki's record set in the 1998 game. Both Rivals.com and Scout.com (now known as 247Sports.com) rated Kanter as a five-star prospect, the highest possible rating.

On November 23, 2009, Kanter verbally committed to play for the Washington Huskies. Kanter chose Washington over UCLA, USC, Indiana and UNLV. However, he re-opened his recruitment in February 2010, and on April 14, Kanter signed a National Letter of Intent to play college basketball for Kentucky.

However, despite signing with the Kentucky Wildcats, the NCAA declared him permanently ineligible as a collegiate athlete because he received approximately $33,000 from Fenerbahçe in excess benefits. The NCAA ruled that this amount was above and beyond what was considered acceptable. On January 7, 2011, the NCAA rejected Kentucky's appeal, upholding that Kanter was permanently ineligible.

Utah Jazz (2011–2015)

Kanter, a center, was drafted third overall by the Utah Jazz in the 2011 NBA draft. Upon being drafted, he said "I'm so happy, I'm so excited. I know the Utah Jazz fans are crazy and I love them. I will bring the team toughness and post moves, rebounding, everything. I will try to do everything to make the playoffs." On December 9, 2011, he signed his rookie scale contract with the Jazz following the conclusion of the NBA lockout. In 2011–12, he became the 10th Jazz rookie in franchise history to appear in every regular-season game. He also recorded the most rebounds for a Jazz rookie in debut with 11 against the Los Angeles Lakers on December 27. In the season, he averaged 4.6 points and 4.2 rebounds in 66 games.

In 2012–13, Kanter improved his averages in every major statistical category, led the team in scoring three times and rebounding four times, and scored in double-figures 22 times. In 70 games (two starts), he averaged 7.2 points and 4.3 rebounds per game. On March 1, 2013, Kanter had the first 20-20 game of his career with career-highs of 23 points and 22 rebounds to lead the Jazz to a 98–68 victory over the Charlotte Bobcats. He later missed the final 10 games of the season due to a dislocated left shoulder.

In 2013–14, Kanter appeared in 80 games (37 starts), averaging 12.3 points and 7.5 rebounds per game. On March 3, 2014, he scored a then career-high 27 points in a 114–88 loss to the Milwaukee Bucks.

On December 16, 2014, Kanter scored a then career-high 29 points in a 119–111 loss to the New Orleans Pelicans.

Oklahoma City Thunder (2015–2017)
On February 19, 2015, Kanter was traded to the Oklahoma City Thunder in a three-team deal that involved the Detroit Pistons. Two days later, he made his debut for the Thunder, recording a double-double with 10 points and 13 rebounds in a 110–103 win over the Charlotte Hornets. On April 1, 2015, he scored a then career-high 30 points in a 135–131 loss to the Dallas Mavericks.

After the 2014–15 season, Kanter became a restricted free agent. On July 9, 2015, he received a four-year, $70 million offer sheet from the Portland Trail Blazers. However, three days later, the Thunder exercised their right of first refusal and matched the offer sheet extended to Kanter by the Trail Blazers. On March 14, 2016, he scored a then season-high 26 points in a 128–94 win over the Portland Trail Blazers. On April 6, he recorded a career-high 33 points and 20 rebounds in a 120–115 loss to the Portland Trail Blazers, becoming the first player in Thunder history to score at least 30 points and grab 20 rebounds in a game. In Game 3 of the Thunder's first-round playoff series against the Dallas Mavericks, Kanter recorded a playoff career-high 21 points and a game-high eight rebounds in a 131–102 win, claiming a 2–1 series lead. In Game 4 of the series, Kanter helped the Thunder go up 3–1 with 28 points on 12-of-13 shooting, setting a playoff career high for the second straight game.

On November 28, 2016, Kanter recorded a season-high 27 points and 10 rebounds in a 112–103 win over the New York Knicks. On January 26, 2017, he sustained a fractured forearm after punching a chair on the Thunder's bench during their game against the Dallas Mavericks. He was subsequently ruled out for six to eight weeks. He returned to action on February 24, 2017 against the Los Angeles Lakers after missing nine games. He finished with four points on 2-for-12 shooting.

When Kanter lost his passport and faced being trapped abroad his teammates, Russell Westbrook and Steven Adams, reached out to him to make sure he was okay.

New York Knicks (2017–2019)

On September 25, 2017, Kanter was traded, along with Doug McDermott and a 2018 second-round pick, to the New York Knicks in exchange for Carmelo Anthony. In his debut for the Knicks in their season opener on October 19, 2017, Kanter had 10 points and seven rebounds in a 105–84 loss to his former team, the Oklahoma City Thunder. Five days later, he recorded 16 points and 19 rebounds in a 110–89 loss to the Boston Celtics. On November 29, 2017, after missing three games with back spasms, Kanter had 22 points and 14 rebounds in a 115–86 win over the Miami Heat. On December 25, 2017, he had a season-high 31 points and tied a career best with 22 rebounds in a 105–98 loss to the Philadelphia 76ers. He joined Wilt Chamberlain, Bill Russell, and Bob Lanier as the only players with a 30-20 game on Christmas. On January 30, 2018, he recorded 20 points, 20 rebounds and five assists in a 111–95 win over the Brooklyn Nets. On February 6, 2018, in a 103–89 loss to the Milwaukee Bucks, Kanter recorded 19 points and 16 rebounds for his sixth consecutive double-double, marking the longest streak by any Knick since David Lee had seven straight from February 9–26, 2010. On March 6, 2018, he had 18 points and 11 rebounds in a 111–87 loss to the Portland Trail Blazers. It was Kanter’s 32nd double-double of the season, a career high.

On October 19, 2018, Kanter scored 29 points in a 107–105 loss to the Nets. A day later, he recorded 17 points and 15 rebounds in a 103–101 loss to the Celtics, becoming the first Knick since Zach Randolph (2007–08) to start the season with three straight double-doubles. On November 5 he recorded 23 points and 24 rebounds in a 116–115 double-overtime loss to the Chicago Bulls. On November 11, he notched his fifth straight double-double with 16 points and 15 rebounds in a 115–89 loss to the Orlando Magic. On November 25, recorded 21 points and a career-high 26 rebounds in a 103–98 win over the Memphis Grizzlies. In late December, Kanter was demoted to a reduced role off the bench. Kanter was waived by the Knicks on February 7, 2019. During his last game at Madison Square Garden, Kanter ran out and kissed the court goodbye.

Portland Trail Blazers (2019)
On February 13, 2019, Kanter signed with the Portland Trail Blazers. He made his debut for the Trail Blazers on February 21, recording 18 points and nine rebounds off the bench in a 113–99 win over the Brooklyn Nets. In game one of the Trail Blazers' first-round playoff series against the Oklahoma City Thunder, Kanter had 20 points and a career playoff-high 18 rebounds in a 104–99 win, becoming just the third player in team history with at least 20 points and 18 rebounds in playoff game: Bill Walton did it three times and LaMarcus Aldridge once.

Boston Celtics (2019–2020)
When free agency opened on July 1, 2019, Kanter and the Boston Celtics agreed to a two-year, $10 million contract. He was officially signed on July 17. With the Celtics, Kanter averaged 8.1 points, 7.4 rebounds, and 1 assist. His season highs were 22 points, 6 blocks, and 19 rebounds. In the playoffs, he scored a total of 50 points in 11 games, averaging 4.5 points per game.

Return to Portland (2020–2021)
On November 20, 2020, Kanter was traded back to the Portland Trail Blazers in a three-team trade that also included the Memphis Grizzlies. On April 10, 2021, in a 118–103 win over the Detroit Pistons, Kanter set a career high and franchise record 30 rebounds, breaking Sidney Wicks record of 27 which he set in 1975. He also scored 24 points in the game, in which he became just the third player in the past 20 years to deliver a 20-point, 30-rebound performance.

Return to Boston (2021–2022)
On August 13, 2021, Freedom signed a one-year, worth $2.7 million veteran's minimum contract with the Boston Celtics.

On February 10, 2022, Freedom was traded, along with Dennis Schröder and Bruno Fernando, to the Houston Rockets in exchange for Daniel Theis. On February 14, the Rockets waived Freedom. Freedom believed he was waived because of his views about the Chinese government. NBA Commissioner Adam Silver denied this claim saying “I made it absolutely clear to [Kanter] that it was completely within his right to speak out on issues that he was passionate about.”

National team career
Kanter made his debut for the Turkish national basketball team at the 2008 FIBA Europe Under-16 Championship in Italy. He dominated throughout the tournament, averaging 22.9 points, 16.5 rebounds and 1.5 blocks in 34.6 minutes per game. However, Jonas Valančiūnas was chosen as the MVP after he averaged 14.3 points, 11.1 rebounds and 2.3 blocks in 23.5 minutes. Kanter went on to earn MVP honors at the 2009 FIBA Europe Under-18 Championship after averaging 18.6 points and 16.4 rebounds while leading Turkey's junior national team to the bronze medal. He declined to play for the senior national team at the 2010 FIBA World Championship which was being held in Turkey as the team went on to win the silver medal. His father claimed he did this in order not to miss the first month of classes at Kentucky.

Kanter played with the Turkish senior team for the first time at the 2011 EuroBasket where he was the youngest player to make the team. He appeared in eight games and averaged 9.6 points and 3.9 rebounds per game. Kanter was left off the team's roster for EuroBasket 2015. Kanter alleged that the omission was due to his relationship with Fethullah Gülen and his support of the Gülen movement while coach Ergin Ataman said that Kanter was excluded because "he did not apologize to teammates for past incidents." Kanter also believes that if he were to go to Turkey to play he would end up in jail, killed by the national government, and a fake poisoning incident would be created.

Career statistics

NBA

Regular season

|-
| style="text-align:left;"| 
| style="text-align:left;"| Utah
| style="background:#cfecec;"|  66* || 0 || 13.2 || .496 || .000 || .667 || 4.2 || .1 || .3 || .3 || 4.6
|-
| style="text-align:left;"| 
| style="text-align:left;"| Utah
| 70 || 2 || 15.4 || .544 || 1.000 || .795 || 4.3 || .4 || .4 || .5 || 7.2
|-
| style="text-align:left;"| 
| style="text-align:left;"| Utah
| 80 || 37 || 26.7 || .491 || .000 || .730 || 7.5 || .9 || .4 || .5 ||  12.3
|-
| style="text-align:left;"| 
| style="text-align:left;"| Utah
| 49 || 48 || 27.1 || .491 || .317 || .788 || 7.8 || .5 || .5 || .3 || 13.8
|-
| style="text-align:left;"| 
| style="text-align:left;"| Oklahoma City
| 26 || 26 || 31.1 || .566 || .750 || .776 || 11.0 || 1.1 || .5 || .5 || 18.7
|-
| style="text-align:left;"| 
| style="text-align:left;"| Oklahoma City
| style="background:#cfecec;"|  82* || 1 || 21.0 || .576 || .476 || .797 || 8.1 || .4 || .3 || .4 || 12.7
|-
| style="text-align:left;"| 
| style="text-align:left;"| Oklahoma City
| 72 || 0 || 21.3 || .545 || .132 || .786 || 6.7 || .9 || .4 || .5 || 14.3
|-
| style="text-align:left;"| 
| style="text-align:left;"| New York
| 71 || 71 || 25.8 || .592 || .000 || .848 || 11.0 || 1.5 || .5 || .5 || 14.1
|-
| style="text-align:left;"| 
| style="text-align:left;"| New York
| 44 || 23 || 25.6 || .536 || .318 || .814 || 10.5 || 1.9 || .4 || .4 || 14.0
|-
| style="text-align:left;"| 
| style="text-align:left;"| Portland
| 23 || 8 || 22.3 || .577 || .250 || .735 || 8.6 || 1.4 || .6 || .4 || 13.1
|-
| style="text-align:left;"| 
| style="text-align:left;"| Boston
| 58 || 7 || 16.9 || .572 || .143 || .707 || 7.4 || 1.0 || .4 || .7 || 8.1
|-
| style="text-align:left;"| 
| style="text-align:left;"| Portland
| style="background:#cfecec;"|  72* || 35 || 24.4 || .604 || .250 || .774 || 11.0 || 1.2 || .5 || .7 || 11.2
|-
| style="text-align:left;"| 
| style="text-align:left;"| Boston
| 35 || 1 || 11.7 || .526 || .400 || .857 || 4.6 || .2 || .1 || .4 || 3.7
|- class="sortbottom"
| style="text-align:center;" colspan="2"| Career 
| 748 || 259 || 21.5 || .548 || .289 || .777 || 7.8 || .9 || .4 || .5 || 11.2

Playoffs

|-
| style="text-align:left;"| 2012
| style="text-align:left;"| Utah
| 4 || 0 || 10.8 || .438 || — || .000 || 4.0 || .3 || .0 || 1.0 || 3.5
|-
| style="text-align:left;"| 2016
| style="text-align:left;"| Oklahoma City
| 18 || 0 || 18.0 || .551 || .143 || .844 || 6.2 || .3 || .3 || .6 || 9.4
|-
| style="text-align:left;"| 2017
| style="text-align:left;"| Oklahoma City
| 5 || 0 || 9.1 || .385 || — || 1.000 || 1.8 || .2 || .0 || .8 || 4.8
|-
| style="text-align:left;"| 2019
| style="text-align:left;"| Portland
| 16 || 14 || 28.8 || .514 || .250 || .756 || 9.7 || 1.2 || .7 || .6 || 11.4
|-
| style="text-align:left;"| 2020
| style="text-align:left;"| Boston
| 11 || 0 || 9.3 || .524 || 1.000 || .500 || 3.9 || .6 || .0 || .0 || 4.5
|-
| style="text-align:left;"| 2021
| style="text-align:left;"| Portland
| 5 || 0 || 11.2 || .500 || — || 1.000 || 2.6 || .0 || .0 || .4 || 2.0 
|- class="sortbottom"
| style="text-align:center;" colspan="2"| Career
| 59 || 14 || 17.5 || .514 || .211 || .777 || 5.9 || .6 || .3 || .5 || 7.6

EuroLeague

|-
| style="text-align:left;"| 2008–09
| style="text-align:left;"| Fenerbahçe
| 4 || 0 || 7.8 || .429 || .000 || .667 || 1.5 || .0 || .3 || .0 || 2.0 || 1.8

Professional wrestling involvement
Kanter is a professional wrestling fan and has previously expressed interest in pursuing a professional wrestling career. Kanter has had online feuds with professional wrestlers including All Elite Wrestling's MJF.

On September 9, 2019, Kanter made a special appearance at a WWE Monday Night Raw event at Madison Square Garden, where prior to Raw going on the air he defeated WWE 24/7 Champion R-Truth to win the title, though he would lose it back to R-Truth moments later (all of which was shown later during the Raw broadcast). Kanter established himself as a heel during the segment, when he revealed his Celtics jersey to the New York City crowd.

Championships and accomplishments
WWE
 WWE 24/7 Championship (1 time)

Politics and activism

Turkey
Kanter received primary and secondary education at Hizmet schools in Turkey and reconnected with the movement's volunteers when Kanter arrived in the United States, even forming a personal relationship with the movement's founder, Fethullah Gülen. With regard to Gülen, Kanter has said, "His views on my religion, as well as ways to solve today's problems, were attractive to me. Gülen is promoting an Islam that highlights justice, respect and love for those who aren't like us. He believes that being a Muslim comes with some kind of duty, and that is to help others. These are principles that I feel strongly about."

Kanter said he became publicly critical of president Recep Tayyip Erdoğan in 2013 due to the corruption scandal in Turkey. After the failed 2016 coup d'état attempt, Kanter criticised Turkish president Erdoğan on Twitter, calling him the "Hitler of our century". Soon after the coup attempt in July, his father and his family publicly disowned him due to his political views and his support for Gülen, imploring him to change his surname, on August 8. Kanter stated that he loves Gülen "more than his family", informally changing his name to Enes Gülen. His father was dismissed from his university position a few weeks later, via government decree numbered 272 on September 1, as part of the 2016–17 Turkish purges. Kanter also received backlash from former NBA player Hedo Türkoğlu. Turkoglu called Kanter's comments "irrational".

In Turkey, Kanter's father was charged as a member of a terrorist group in 2018. He was arrested, then was released after being detained for five days. Kanter believed his father was targeted by the Turkish government and could face many years in prison. Kanter was unable to contact his friends and family back in Turkey because he feared the conversations will be taped and they will be harmed. Six days after the cancellation of his passport, the Turkish government issued an arrest warrant for Kanter due to his membership in Hizmet, an Islamist fraternal movement. Turkey said that charged citizens who fail to come to Turkey during September 2017 face revocation of citizenship; in September 2017, Kanter described himself as stateless. According to Sports Illustrated, "Although Kanter might dismiss the Turkish arrest warrant as toothless, he faces the more impactful problem of being a man without a country." In December 2017, the Associated Press reported that Turkish prosecutors were seeking more than four years in prison for Kanter, who would be tried in absentia.

Also in January 2019, Turkey put an extradition request on Kanter and requested that Interpol put a red notice for his arrest. However, according to Interpol's website, no red notice was issued. U.S. Senator Ron Wyden of Oregon took up Kanter's cause, stating "The United States must not stay silent in the face of such a blatant attack on free thought and expression." Kanter later credited the bond he and Wyden had forged as part of the reason he sacrificed salary to facilitate a trade back to Portland in 2020.

It was reported on January 10, 2023 the president of Turkey Recep Tayyip Erdoğan placed a $500,000 bounty on Enes Kanter and his name was added to Turkey's "Most Wanted" terrorist list.

Travel disruptions
In May 2017, while on a tour hosting basketball camps in Hong Kong and Japan and other parts of Asia, Kanter was in Jakarta, Indonesia. At 2:30 AM, Kanter's manager knocked on his door with alarming information. He was told that two men identifying themselves as Indonesian government officials had visited the camp and wanted to speak to find out if Kanter was sleeping at the camp, which he often did. Kanter, staying at a hotel with his manager, instead immediately left Indonesia, going to Singapore, then Bucharest, Romania via Frankfurt, Germany. On May 20, 2017, when trying to fly into Romaniawhere another camp was planned to be heldKanter was not allowed into the country and was told by officials there that his passport had been cancelled by the Turkish embassy. Kanter was temporarily stranded in Romania, but eventually flew to London and then back to the United States. While stuck in Romania, Kanter took to Twitter to explain his situation and the hashtag #FreeEnes went viral. Upon landing in the US, Kanter said the first thing he did was pray.

In January 2019, he decided against travelling to London with the Knicks, fearing that his life could be in danger if he traveled to Europe. Kanter did not travel to Toronto with the Portland Trail Blazers in March 2019 for the same reason. According to a 2019 ESPN story, FBI agents issued him a communications device that allows him to contact the organization at a moment's notice due to credible threats against his life.

China
In 2019, Kanter was the subject of an E:60 ESPN documentary called Enemy of the State. In October 2021, he condemned Xi Jinping, the Chinese paramount leader, as a "brutal dictator" and expressed his support for the Free Tibet movement on Twitter. In retaliation, the Chinese government stopped streaming all Boston Celtics games. Also in October, he led a rally in Washington D.C., urging the U.S. Congress to pass the Uyghur Forced Labor Prevention Act, a law that would limit imports from the alleged areas where China has oppressed Uyghurs, Kazakhs, and Kyrgyz minorities.

In November 2021, Kanter appeared in interviews on Fox News and CNN advocating for the boycott of the 2022 Winter Olympic Games in China. On December 6, 2021, the United States announced a diplomatic boycott of the games, meaning that athletes may still participate but no "diplomatic or official representation" will be sent from the United States government.

After Kanter was waived out of his most recent contract, he claimed he was pushed out of the NBA to appease the Chinese state. Adam Silver and the NBA have denied that Kanter's activism have led to him being blackballed.

In June 2022, Kanter took part in a press conference with Canadian Senator Leo Housakos and Canadian MP Garnett Genuis. In this press conference, Kanter spoke about how his interest into the situation regarding the Uighurs in China began. The Canadian Government was called upon to halt the importation of goods that were made with forced labor from the province of Xinjiang.

On January 2023, Kanter sat down with journalist John Stossel in an interview titled, "The FULL Enes Kanter Freedom: On China, NBA Hypocrisy, LeBron & Cena", where he summarized his experiences pushing back against countries, including China, that don't allow freedom of speech for their citizens, and criticized LeBron James and John Cena for their China ties.

Personal life
In 2019, he wrote in The Washington Post about the challenge of observing Ramadan during the NBA playoffs, which includes daytime fasting while still playing NBA basketball games.

He has said that he learned English during college by watching SpongeBob SquarePants and Jersey Shore.

From 2018 to 2019, Kanter dated professional wrestler Dana Brooke. He began dating fashion designer and amateur equestrian Ariana Rockefeller in 2020.

He began following a plant-based diet in 2020, with the goal of switching to a vegan lifestyle.

Kanter became an American citizen on November 29, 2021, and also legally changed his name to Enes Kanter Freedom at the same time to mark the occasion.

Philanthropy
During the summer of 2018, Kanter held 16 free basketball camps in the United States. Also in the same year, Kanter started a fundraiser for wildfire victims in Greece. In the summer of 2019, 40 free basketball camps were initially scheduled, but he ultimately hosted 50. Another 50 free camps were planned for the summer of 2020.

Works and publications

See also 
 List of youngest EuroLeague players

References

Further information

External links

 
 
 Enes Kanter at FIBA

1992 births
Living people
21st-century Muslims
American human rights activists
American humanitarians
American Muslims
American philanthropists
Boston Celtics players
Celebrities who have won professional wrestling championships
Centers (basketball)
Fenerbahçe men's basketball players
Fugitives wanted by Turkey
Fugitives wanted on terrorism charges
Gülen movement
Minority rights activists
National Basketball Association players from Switzerland
National Basketball Association players from Turkey
New York Knicks players
Oklahoma City Thunder players
People from Simi Valley, California
People with acquired American citizenship
Portland Trail Blazers players
Sportspeople from Zürich
Swiss democracy activists
Swiss emigrants to the United States
Swiss expatriate basketball people in Turkey
Swiss expatriate basketball people in the United States
Swiss human rights activists
Swiss humanitarians
Swiss men's basketball players
Swiss Muslims
Swiss people of Turkish descent
Swiss philanthropists
Turkish democracy activists
Turkish emigrants to the United States
Turkish exiles
Turkish expatriate basketball people in the United States
Turkish human rights activists
Turkish humanitarians
Turkish men's basketball players
Turkish Muslims
Turkish philanthropists
Utah Jazz draft picks
Utah Jazz players
WWE 24/7 Champions